was a Japanese judoka. He won a gold medal in the heavyweight division (above 80 kg) at the 1964 Summer Olympics in Tokyo and a world title in 1965.

Early life and education
Inokuma was born in Yokosuka, Kanagawa, and took judo at age 15. He entered the Tokyo University of Education (current University of Tsukuba) and won the All-Japan Judo Championships in 1959 at only 21 years of age, to become the first student competitor to win the championship. He placed second in the All-Japan Championships in 1960 and 1961, both times losing to the future Olympic silver medalist and lifelong friend Akio Kaminaga.

Career
Inokuma won the 1963 All-Japan Championships, but placed 4th in the 1964 All-Japan Championships and ended up entering the 1964 Summer Olympics in the +80 kg division (the heaviest weight category at the time excluding the open category). His main rivals there were Canadian Doug Rogers, who trained with Inokuma in Japan, and Georgian Anzor Kiknadze, who nearly defeated Inokuma in 1961 using sambo armlock techniques. Inokuma faced Kiknadze in the semifinals. He managed to avoid the armlocks and threw Kiknadze at the five minute to advance to the final against Rogers, who was about 30 kg heavier. In the final little happened in the first 10 minutes, and the referee, Charles Palmer threatened to disqualify both, with little effect. Inokuma was awarded the gold for a slightly higher activity.

After graduating, Inokuma became a judo instructor for Juntendo University and the Tokyo Metropolitan Police Department. In 1965, he entered the Open weight class of the World Judo Championships intending to wrestle Dutch judo champion Anton Geesink, but Geesink went to the +80 kg division that year, and the two never faced off against one another. Both Geesink and Inokuma won gold medals in the competition, and Inokuma announced his retirement shortly afterwards, citing lack of motivation.

Later life and death
In 1966, he resigned from his post at the Tokyo Police Department to become an executive at the Tokai Construction company (東海建設株式会社). He continued to work with judo as an advisor for the International Judo Federation, and as an instructor at Tokai University, where he coached future Olympic gold medalist Yasuhiro Yamashita. He also authored several books and manuals on judo. He became the CEO of  Tokai Construction   in 1993. 

Inokuma died by suicide by seppuku in 2001, possibly due to  financial losses suffered by his company.

References

External links
 

1938 births
2001 suicides
Academic staff of Tokai University
Japanese chief executives
Japanese male judoka
Judoka at the 1964 Summer Olympics
Olympic judoka of Japan
Olympic gold medalists for Japan
Olympic medalists in judo
People from Yokosuka, Kanagawa
Seppuku from Meiji period to present
World judo champions
Suicides by sharp instrument in Japan
Medalists at the 1964 Summer Olympics
20th-century Japanese people
21st-century Japanese people